The Kent Cyclist Battalion was a bicycle infantry battalion of the Territorial Force, part of the British Army.  Formed in 1908, it was sent to India in the First World War and saw active service during the Third Anglo-Afghan War in 1919.  In 1920, it was converted as part of the Royal Artillery.

History

Formation
The battalion was newly raised at Tonbridge on 1 April 1908 as a bicycle infantry battalion of the British Army's Territorial Force.  Initially designated as the 6th (Cyclist) Battalion, Queen's Own (Royal West Kent Regiment), in 1910 it was separated from the regiment and redesignated as the independent Kent Cyclist Battalion so as to encourage recruitment from the eastern part of the county.

In August 1914, the battalion was Headquartered at the Corn Exchange in Tonbridge and had the following companies:
 A Company - Bromley
 B Company - Tonbridge including Pembury Troop
 C Company - Beckenham
 D Company - Maidstone including Chatham Troop
 E Company - Tunbridge Wells
 F Company - Canterbury including Ashford and Whitstable Troops
 G Company - Ramsgate including Margate and Sandwich Troops
 H Company - Sandgate including Hythe, Dover and Folkestone Troops
At the outbreak of the First World War, the battalion was in Eastern Command, unattached to any higher formation.  It was to be used as mobile infantry, and for work on signals, scouting and similar activities.

First World War
In accordance with the Territorial and Reserve Forces Act 1907 (7 Edw. 7, c.9) which brought the Territorial Force into being, the TF was intended to be a home defence force for service during wartime and members could not be compelled to serve outside the country. However, on the outbreak of war on 4 August 1914, many members volunteered for Imperial Service.  Therefore, TF units were split in August and September 1914 into 1st Line (liable for overseas service) and 2nd Line (home service for those unable or unwilling to serve overseas) units.  Later, 3rd Line units were formed to act as reserves, providing trained replacements for the 1st and 2nd Lines.

1/1st Kent Cyclist Battalion
The battalion was mobilized on 4 August 1914 at the outbreak of the First World War and moved to its war station at Canterbury.  During 1915 it served on coast defences between Swale and Ryewith a detachment in the Medway Defencesattached to the 57th (2nd West Lancashire) Division.  On 24 November 1915, it concentrated at Canterbury.  On 2 December 1915, it left 57th (2nd West Lancashire) Division and moved to Chiseldon (near Swindon, Wiltshire).

It was joined at Chiseldon by three more cyclist battalions: the 2/6th (Cyclist) Battalion, Royal Sussex Regiment, the 1/9th (Cyclist) Battalion, Hampshire Regiment and the 1/25th (Cyclist) Battalion, London Regiment.  They were converted to infantry and formed a brigade, originally intended for service in East Africa.  Instead, they sailed for India on 8 February 1916.

The battalion landed at Bombay on 3 March 1916 and was assigned to Southern Brigade, 9th (Secunderabad) Division at Bangalore.  In December it was transferred to 44th (Ferozepore) Brigade, 3rd Lahore Divisional Area and in February 1917 it moved with the brigade to 16th Indian Division.  Between 4 March and 15 April it served with the brigade in the South Waziristan Field Force; it was then at Dalhousie with Bannu Brigade (April to July 1917).  It served with the North Waziristan Field Force from 30 May to 18 August, rejoining 44th (Ferozepore) Brigade in July.  It earned its first battle honourN.W. Frontier, India 1917for these operations.

It returned to Dalhousie on 25 August where it remained until mobilizing for Baluchistan on 5 March 1918.  Still with 44th (Ferozepore) Brigade, it served in Baluchistan between 11 March and 1 May 1918, before returning to Dalhousie once again.  It earned its second battle honourBaluchistan 1918for this operation.

It helped to quell riots in the Punjab between 12 and 27 April 1919.  Between 19 May and 17 August 1919 it took part in the Third Anglo-Afghan War as part of 44th (Ferozepore) Brigade, 16th Indian Division in the Peshawar area.  It earned its third and final battle honourAfghanistan 1919for its actions in the war.

The battalion was posted to Dagshai from 21 August to 3 November before sailing for England on 8 November 1919.  It landed at Plymouth on 6 December 1919 and was then demobilized.  It became Kent Cyclist Battalion once again before being disembodied in February 1920.

2/1st Kent Cyclist Battalion
The 2nd Line battalion was formed at Canterbury in 1914 or 1915; it remained in England throughout the war.  In 1916 it was still at Canterbury.  By September 1916, the battalion had joined the 6th Cyclist Brigade (former 15th Mounted Brigade) in the 2nd Cyclist Division.  The brigade was headquartered at Wingham, Kent.  The division was broken up on 16 November 1916 and the battalion was transferred to 5th Cyclist Brigade (former 9th Mounted Brigade) in the new 1st Mounted Division at Ramsgate.  By May 1917, it was attached to 67th (2nd Home Counties) Division and was at Folkestone from May to August 1917.

In March 1918, the battalion returned to The Cyclist Division where it remained until the end of the war.  It was at Lydd from August 1918 and in November 1918 was at Folkestone.  The battalion was disbanded on 28 July 1919.

On 4 July 1915, the battalion provided personnel for the 9th Provisional Cyclist Company.  The company was disbanded at Margate on 13 April 1916.

3/1st Kent Cyclist Battalion
The 3rd Line battalion was formed at Canterbury in 1915 to provide trained replacements for the 1st and 2nd Line battalions.  It may have been disbanded in 1915 or 1916.

Post war
The Territorial Force was disbanded after the First World War, although this was a formality and it was reformed in 1920.  From 1 October 1921 it was renamed as the Territorial Army.

One major change with the new Territorial Army had an effect on the number of infantry battalions.  The original 14 divisions were reformed with the pre-war standard of three brigades of four battalions each, for a total of 168 battalions.  Infantry were no longer to be included as Army Troops or part of the Coastal Defence Forces so the pre-war total of 208 battalions had to be reduced by 40.  This was achieved by either converting certain battalions to other roles, usually artillery or engineers, or by amalgamating pairs of battalions within a regiment.  In particular, based on war time experience, the Army decided to dispense with cyclists units and the existing battalions were either disbanded or converted to artillery or signals units.

The Kent Cyclists were reformed at Bromley as a medium artillery battery of the Royal Garrison Artillery (RGA) on 7 February 1920 as 208th (Bromley) Battery.  It joined the former 4th Home Counties Brigade, Royal Field Artillery and former Home Counties (Kent) Heavy Battery, RGA) in 13th (Kent) Medium Brigade, RGA, soon redesignated as 52nd (Kent) Medium Brigade, Royal Garrison Artillery.

Battle honours
The Kent Cyclist Battalion was awarded the following battle honours:
N.W. Frontier, India 1917
Baluchistan 1918
Afghanistan 1919
It was the only cyclist battalion to be awarded battle honours.

Honorary Colonel
1909–1921: Brevet Colonel Sir Henry Streatfield

See also

 Army Cyclist Corps

Notes

References

Further reading

Bibliography

External links
 
 
 
 
 
 
 

Infantry regiments of the British Army
Cyclist units and formations of the British Army
Military units and formations established in 1908
Military units and formations disestablished in 1920
Battalions of the British Army in World War I
Military units and formations in Kent
1908 establishments in the United Kingdom